Michelle Gomez (born 23 November 1966) is a Scottish-American actress. She gained recognition for her roles in the comedy series The Book Group (2002–2003), Green Wing (2004–2007), and Bad Education (2012–2013). She went on to appear as Missy in the long-running British science fiction series Doctor Who (2014–2017), for which she was nominated for the BAFTA TV Award for Best Supporting Actress.

Gomez received further recognition and acclaim for her roles as Lilith / Madam Satan and Mary Wardwell in the Netflix supernatural horror series Chilling Adventures of Sabrina (2018–2020) and as Miranda Croft in the HBO Max dark comedy thriller series The Flight Attendant (2020–2022).

Early life
Gomez was born in Glasgow to Tony and May Gomez. Her father is originally from Montserrat and is of Portuguese descent. He was a photographer.  Her mother ran a modelling agency.

From the moment she saw a production of Kiss Me, Kate at the age of seven, Gomez wanted to be an actress, which her parents encouraged. She attended Shawlands Academy from 1978 to 1983 and trained at the Royal Scottish Academy of Music and Drama.

Career
Gomez's first major role was in the 1998 film The Acid House, based on three Irvine Welsh short stories. She went on to star in the cult Channel 4 comedy drama The Book Group before landing her role as staff liaison officer Sue White in the Channel 4 comedy Green Wing. She played Michelle in Carrie and Barry for the BBC (which coincidentally was first broadcast the same night as Green Wing), and starred as PC Sally Bobbins in the BBC 2 sitcom Feel the Force. She appeared in Gunslinger's Revenge.

In 2005, Gomez appeared in the film Chromophobia. In 2006, she starred in the film The Good Housekeeping Guide. In 2007 she starred in a drama by Irvine Welsh and Dean Cavanagh called Wedding Belles, and starred in Boeing-Boeing at the Comedy Theatre in London. Also in 2007, she guest-starred in the Doctor Who audio play Valhalla. In 2008 she joined the Royal Shakespeare Company, and performed as Kate in The Taming of the Shrew at the Courtyard Theatre and the Novello Theatre.

In 2012, Gomez starred in the British film The Wedding Video, portraying the psychologically unstable wedding planner. In the same year, she appeared in the British comedy series Bad Education, portraying the deputy-head Isobel Pickwell, which returned for a second series in 2013. In 2014, she began producing comedy sketches as "Heather" an agony aunt for YouTube channel Wildseed Studios.

She had a recurring role in series 8 – 10 of Doctor Who as a character called Missy. Her true identity was revealed in the Series 8 two-part finale "Dark Water" / "Death in Heaven" as a female incarnation of the Master, the Doctor's longstanding nemesis. Gomez reprised the role in the opening two-part story of the ninth series "The Magician's Apprentice" / "The Witch's Familiar" and again in the show's tenth series, which began broadcasting in April 2017. In May 2017, Gomez stated that it would be her last series in the role.

Gomez's portrayal of Missy earned her a nomination for the Best Actress (Television) award at the 2015 British Academy Scotland Awards. Later, Gomez also received a nod as Best Supporting Actress at the British Academy Television Awards.

In 2018, Gomez was cast as Lilith / Madam Satan and Mary Wardwell in the Netflix series Chilling Adventures of Sabrina. She later appeared as Miranda Croft in the HBO Max dark comedy thriller series The Flight Attendant in November 2020. The show was later renewed for a second season, slated to be released in late 2022.

In 2021, Gomez was cast in season 3 of Doom Patrol as Madame Rouge. She also provided the voice of Morag in The Loud House Movie.

Personal life
Gomez has been married to actor Jack Davenport since 1 May 2000. She gave birth to their son in 2010. On 28 February 2023, Gomez announced on Instagram that she, Davenport, and their son became naturalized American citizens.

Filmography

Film

Television

Video games

Notes

References

External links

 
 Winging It – Green Wing series interview
 Audio interview about her 2008 role in Taming of the Shrew
 

Living people
1966 births
20th-century Scottish actresses
21st-century Scottish actresses
Actresses from Glasgow
Alumni of the Royal Conservatoire of Scotland
British expatriates in the United States
British people of Montserratian descent
British Shakespearean actresses
People educated at Shawlands Academy
Royal Shakespeare Company members
Scottish film actresses
Scottish people of Portuguese descent
Scottish stage actresses
Scottish television actresses
Scottish video game actresses